The Chairman of the Legislative Assembly of Orenburg Oblast is the presiding officer of that legislature.

Chairmen

References 

Lists of legislative speakers in Russia
Politics of Orenburg Oblast